Erwan Käser (born 8 June 1992) is a Swiss cross-country skier. He competed in the 2018 Winter Olympics.

Cross-country skiing results
All results are sourced from the International Ski Federation (FIS).

Olympic Games

World Championships

World Cup

Season standings

References

External links
 
 

1992 births
Living people
Cross-country skiers at the 2018 Winter Olympics
Swiss male cross-country skiers
Olympic cross-country skiers of Switzerland